Lycée Jean Pierre Vernant is a senior high school/sixth-form college in Sèvres, Hauts-de-Seine, France, in the Paris metropolitan area.

The school serves Sèvres, Chaville, Saint-Cloud, and Ville d'Avray.

It was formerly known as the Lycée de Sèvres.  it has 190 teachers and 1,972 students, with 1,522 secondary students and 450 in the superior (supérieur) level.

History
It was founded in 1920 as the école d’application de l’Ecole Normale Supérieure de jeunes filles, a school for girls.

References

Further reading
 Paulette Armier, Armand Hatinguais, Une demeure. Une femme. Le Centre international d'études pédagogiques de 1945 à 1966 : 25e anniversaire du Centre international d'études pédagogiques de Sèvres et 50e anniversaire du lycée de Sèvres, ESF éditeur, 1971

External links
 Lycée Jean Pierre Vernant 

Lycées in Hauts-de-Seine
1920 establishments in France
Educational institutions established in 1920